

Games released or invented in the 1940s
Conflict (1940)
Cluedo (1947)

Games
Games by decade
1940s decade overviews